NGC 461 is an intermediate spiral galaxy of type SAB(s)c located in the constellation Sculptor. It was discovered on September 25, 1834 by John Herschel. It was described by Dreyer as "pretty bright, round, gradually a little brighter middle (perhaps 1° wrong?)."

References

External links
 

0461
18340925
Sculptor (constellation)
Intermediate spiral galaxies
004636